Aemilia rubriplaga is a moth of the family Erebidae. It was described by Francis Walker in 1855. It is found in Venezuela.

References

Moths described in 1855
Phaegopterina
Moths of South America